Captain Benoit (French: Le capitaine Benoît) is a 1938 French thriller film directed by Maurice de Canonge and starring Jean Murat, Mireille Balin and Madeleine Robinson.

Synopsis
An officer saves the life of a foreign prince who is in France to buy seaplanes, while pursued by his enemies.

Cast
 Jean Murat as Capitaine Benoît  
 Mireille Balin as Véra Agatcheff  
 Madeleine Robinson as Denise Benoît  
 Raymond Aimos as Vic, le policier  
 Jean Mercanton as Le prince Joachim / Jean-Jacques de Landelle  
 Jean Témerson as Tripoff, le touriste 
 Jean Brochard as Mercadier  
 Jean Daurand as Griffon 
 Hugues de Bagratide as Le sultan  
 Marguerite de Morlaye 
 Nilda Duplessy 
 Jean Heuzé as Un officier  
 Philippe Janvier as Un officier  
 Armand Larcher as Le préfet  
 Pierre Magnier as Le colonel  
 Jacques Mattler as Un conjuré  
 Marthe Mellot as La grand-mère  
 Alexandre Mihalesco as Adhémar  
 Micheline Rolla 
 Georges Serrano

References

Bibliography 
 Spring, D.W. Propaganda, Politics and Film, 1918–45. Springer, 1982.

External links 
 

1938 films
French thriller films
1938 thriller films
1930s French-language films
Films directed by Maurice de Canonge
French black-and-white films
1930s French films

fr:Le Capitaine Benoît